Mourad Fallah (born June 8, 1976 in Casablanca) is a former Moroccan footballer.

Honours
MAS Fez
Moroccan Throne Cup Runner up: 2001, 2002

Wydad Casablanca
Botola: 2005–06
Moroccan Throne Cup Runner up: 2004

FAR Rabat
Botola: 2007–08
Moroccan Throne Cup: 2008, 2009

External links 
Player profile - wydad.com
Player profile - national-football-teams.com

1976 births
Living people
Footballers from Casablanca
Botola players
Moroccan footballers
Raja CA players
JS Massira players
Maghreb de Fès players
Wydad AC players
AS FAR (football) players
Association football defenders
Wydad de Fès players